Insanity is a 2015 Hong Kong-Chinese psychological thriller film directed by  and starring Sean Lau and Huang Xiaoming. It was released on April 2, 2015 in Hong Kong and a day later in China on April 3, 2015.

Premise
A promising psychiatrist faces the dark side of his mind once again after treating a patient who was convicted of murder.

Cast
Sean Lau as Fan Kwok-sang (范國生)
Huang Xiaoming as Chow Ming-kit (周明杰)
Fiona Sit as Shum Po-yee (岑寶兒)
Alex Fong as Doctor Lui (雷醫生)
Paw Hee-ching as Fong Wai-ling's mother
Michelle Ye as Fong Wai-ling (方慧玲)
Fredric Mao as Director Lau (劉院長)
Alien Sun as Chow Ming-kit's mother
Bonnie Sin as Wong Yan-nei (王恩妮)
Michelle Wai as Mona
Joseph Lee as Officer Lee (李警官)

Reception

Awards and nominations

Soundtrack

References

External links

Hong Kong psychological thriller films
2015 films
2015 psychological thriller films
Chinese thriller films
2010s Cantonese-language films
2015 directorial debut films
2010s Hong Kong films